King of the Hotel (French:Le roi des palaces) is a 1932 British-French comedy film directed by Carmine Gallone and starring Jules Berry, Betty Stockfeld and Armand Dranem. It was based on a play by Henry Kistemaeckers. The film's sets were designed by the art director Serge Piménoff.

A separate English-language version King of the Ritz was also made.

Cast
 Jules Berry as Claude  
 Betty Stockfeld as Betty  
 Armand Dranem as King Stanislas de Poldavie  
 Simone Simon as Victoire  
 Georges Morton as Prefect of police  
 Guy Sloux as Teddy Smith  
 Alexander D'Arcy as Alonzo  
 Emmanuel Ligny as Jimmy 
 José Noguéro   
 Suzette O'Nil 
 Simone Chobillon

References

Bibliography 
 Crisp, G.C. Genre, Myth, and Convention in the French Cinema, 1929–1939. Indiana University Press, 2002.

External links 
 

1932 films
French comedy films
British comedy films
British films based on plays
1932 comedy films
1930s French-language films
Films directed by Carmine Gallone
Films with screenplays by Henri-Georges Clouzot
French multilingual films
French black-and-white films
British black-and-white films
1932 multilingual films
1930s British films
1930s French films